Polymorphism, polymorphic, polymorph, polymorphous, or polymorphy may refer to:

Computing
 Polymorphism (computer science), the ability in programming to present the same programming interface for differing underlying forms
 Ad hoc polymorphism, applying polymorphic functions to arguments of different types
 Parametric polymorphism, abstracts types, so that multiple can be used with a single implementation
 Bounded quantification, restricts type parameters to a range of subtypes
 Subtyping, different classes related by some common superclass can be used in place of that superclass
 Row polymorphism, uses structural subtyping to allow polymorphism over records
 Polymorphic code, self-modifying program code designed to defeat anti-virus programs or reverse engineering

Science

Biology
 Chromosomal polymorphism, a condition where one species contains members with varying chromosome counts or shapes
 Cell polymorphism, variability in size of cells or nuclei
 Gene polymorphism, the existence of more than one allele at a gene's locus within a population
 Genetic polymorphism, the branching of the genetic tree, caused by two or more alleles occurring at one DNA position or in one DNA region, each with appreciable frequency in the population
 Lipid polymorphism, the property of amphiphiles that gives rise to various aggregations of lipids
 Polymorphic, a wave pattern seen on an electrocardiogram; See QRS complex
 Polymorphism (biology), the occurrence of more than one form in the same population of a species
 Polymorphism (RLFP), a technique that exploits variations in homologous DNA sequences

Other sciences
 Polymorphism (materials science), the existence of a solid material in two or more crystal structures, known as polymorphs
 Polymorph, a marketing name for polycaprolactone, a type of thermoplastic which fuses at 60°C

Fiction
 Polymorph, a shapeshifting being in:
 "Polymorph" (Red Dwarf), third episode of series III of the science fiction sitcom
 "Emohawk: Polymorph II", fourth episode of series VI of the science fiction sitcom
 Polymorph (novel), a 1997 cyberpunk novel by Scott Westerfeld 
 Polymorph (Red Dwarf character), seen in the series III episode "Polymorph"  
 Polymorph, a magical spell in many fantasy role-playing games that transforms a target into one of many different creatures for a period of time

See also
 
 Dimorphism (disambiguation)
 Monomorphic (disambiguation)
 Polymorphism in Lepidoptera
 Shapeshifter (disambiguation)